Tower Bridge Quay previously St. Katharine's Pier, is a river transport pier on the River Thames, in London, UK. It is owned & operated by Woods River Cruises trading as Woods’ Silver Fleet and served by various river transport and cruise operators. 

It is situated on the north bank of the Thames, on the east side of Tower Bridge, and immediately in front of the Thistle Tower Hotel. The pier is about ten minutes walk from Tower Hill Underground station.

St. Katharine's Pier should not be confused with the nearby St Katharine Docks, which is a private yacht marina and residential area.

Services
The main service from St Katharine Pier is a "hop-on, hop-off" circular river cruise operated by Crown River Cruises which goes west non-stop to Westminster Millennium Pier before returning east via the South Bank arts centre.

There is also a Westminster-Greenwich express service run by Thames River Services which circles around the Thames Barrier before returning to central London.

Interchange
Tower Hill Underground station and Tower Gateway DLR station   for London Underground and Docklands Light Railway. 
 Tower Millennium Pier is located on the other (West) side of Tower Bridge, providing the main commuter river boat services

Local attractions
St Katharine Docks
Tower of London
Tower Bridge

References

London River Services
Piers in London
Wapping
London Borough of Tower Hamlets